Megan E. Schwamb (born 1984) is an American astronomer and planetary scientist, and lecturer at Queen's University, Belfast. Schwamb has discovered and co-discovered several trans-Neptunian objects, and is involved with Citizen science projects such as Planet Four and Planet Hunters.

Biography 

In 2006, Schwamb graduated from the University of Pennsylvania with a B.A summa cum laude with Distinction in physics. She went on to study astrophysics in the California Institute of Technology, graduated Master of Science in 2008. Schwamb finished her Ph.D. in planetary science in 2011, also from the California Institute of Technology. Her thesis was researching "Beyond Sedna: Probing the Distant Solar System", and her advisor was Michael Brown.

Between 2010 and 2013 Schwamb was a postdoctoral fellow at Yale University. She worked at the Institute of Astronomy and Astrophysics at Academia Sinica in Taipei in Republic of China (Taiwan) from 2013 until 2016. Schwamb then held the post of assistant scientist at the Gemini Observatory. before moving to Queen's University, Belfast. She is the creator and co-founder of Astrotweeps, a Rotation Curation account on astronomy.

Schwamb is involved in citizen science projects. She is a founding science team member for Planet Four, project intended for mapping seasonal fans on the South Pole of Mars. She is also part of the science team leading at Planet Hunters a project in which users analyze data from the NASA Kepler Space Mission while searching for exoplanets.

Awards and honors 

In 2017 she received a Carl Sagan Medal for excellence in public communication, for the creation of the Astrotweeps and Planet Four projects. On 13 April 2017, asteroid 11814 Schwamb, discovered by Schelte Bus at the Siding Spring Observatory in 1981, was named in her honor.

Research discoveries

She specialized in studying sednoids, and co-discovered several trans-Neptunian objects.

List of discovered minor planets 

Megan Schwamb is credited by the Minor Planet Center with the discovery and co-discovery of 16 minor planets during 2007–2010 (see list).

References

External links 
 
 
 , SETI Talks 2018, 
 , WIRED, 2015
 Meg Schwamb YouTube channel

1984 births
Living people
American women astronomers

Discoverers of minor planets
Women planetary scientists
21st-century  American  astronomers
21st-century American women scientists
People from Huntsville, Alabama
Scientists from Alabama
Planetary scientists
University of Pennsylvania alumni
California Institute of Technology alumni
Yale University faculty
Academics of Queen's University Belfast